The Great Rock 'n' Roll Swindle is the soundtrack album of the film of the same name by the Sex Pistols.

Production 
By the time the soundtrack was being prepared, Johnny Rotten (Lydon) had left the band and refused to participate in the project. Manager Malcolm McLaren was left with a major problem - how to sell a double LP soundtrack with no songs featuring the Sex Pistols' dynamic, original vocalist. Desperate for a "workaround", McLaren discovered an October 1976 rehearsal session by the original lineup. In an effort to keep up their "chops", the band would rehearse during downtime at Wessex Studios while attempting to record the 'Anarchy In The UK' 7" single for EMI with producer Dave Goodman in October 1976. Goodman secretly caught the rehearsal on tape. The band ran through some cover songs, many of which were staples at early Sex Pistols shows, along with a few more obscure tracks. Unfortunately, the recording was raw and being a simple four-track recording, it was not suitable for commercial release. McLaren then decided to take John Lydon's vocal track along with Glen Matlock's (also long gone from the band) original bass track and combine them with newly re-recorded guitar and drum tracks performed by Steve Jones and Paul Cook. McLaren suddenly had "new" Sex Pistols material suitable for release and performed exclusively by the original lineup. Better still, fans of the band had never heard these recordings. This tactic also gave the impression that the original band was still together. McLaren used this confusion and the "new" material to market and promote not only the movie soundtrack, but the film itself. The original rehearsal recording (without the newly recorded, overdubbed tracks) eventually appeared, in its entirety, on the Sex Pistols Box Set released by Virgin Records in 2002.

The double album features a significant number of tracks that omit Lydon entirely, most of them written and recorded after he had left the band. These include Sid Vicious singing cover songs, two new original songs ("Silly Thing", sung by Cook and "Lonely Boy", sung by Jones), tracks Cook and Jones recorded with Ronnie Biggs, the title track and "Who Killed Bambi?" sung by Edward Tudor-Pole, and numerous novelty tracks including French street musicians playing "Anarchy in the UK" and a medley of several Sex Pistols songs covered by a disco band.

Two further tracks were recorded along with "Lonely Boy" and "Silly Thing" between May and July 1978; "Black Leather" and "Here We Go Again". While the two songs did not end up on either the film or the soundtrack, both were later released on a 7" single as part of the Sex Pistols "Pistols Pack" 6 single plastic wallet collection (released as a box set in Greece), as well as on the Japanese "The Very Best Of Sex Pistols" LP.

Along with Rotten, people who sang on The Great Rock 'n' Roll Swindle include:
Paul Cook – lead vocals on "Silly Thing" (1978), backing vocals on "The Great Rock 'n' Roll Swindle" (1979)
Steve Jones – lead vocals on "Lonely Boy", backing vocals on "The Great Rock 'n' Roll Swindle", lead vocals on "Friggin' in the Riggin" and lead vocals on the single release of "Silly Thing" (1978)
Ronnie Biggs – lead vocals on "No One Is Innocent", "Belsen Vos a Gassa" (1978)
Malcolm McLaren – lead vocals on "You Need Hands" (1979)
Edward Tudor-Pole – lead vocals on "Rock Around the Clock", "Who Killed Bambi", "The Great Rock 'n' Roll Swindle", (1979)
Sid Vicious – lead vocals on "My Way", "C'mon Everybody", "Something Else" (1978)

This album would be the last compiled recordings to feature Sid Vicious in the studio due to his death three weeks before the albums release and after only playing an overdubbed bass guitar on "Bodies" on the Never Mind the Bollocks album would also be his sole studio recordings as a vocalist (his subsequent appearances as a singer would be only in live recordings of concerts recorded in the months leading up to his death). This would also be the first set of recordings to feature guitarist Steve Jones and drummer Paul Cook in roles as lead vocalists before they would form the Professionals, and the final album of new material credited to the Sex Pistols, albeit it technically not being a second studio album due to various guests and other artist featuring on it.

Variations
The album has been released in different variations featuring different track listings. There have been two main versions, which were featured on double-album vinyl and CD. The biggest differences between the track lists is that the songs are re-arranged and version A features "I Wanna Be Me" and the Dave Goodman produced version of "Anarchy in the UK" while version B features "Watcha Gonna Do About It" and the Chris Thomas produced version of "Anarchy in the UK". Version A was the most common track list until 1992, afterwards version B is the most common. A 2012 reissue by Universal incorporates both track lists, as it features the Version A track list with "Watcha Gonna Do About It" added on to the end.

Additionally, a single-album version was released in May 1980 to tie in with the release of the film, and featured a different cover and a pared-down track list, which excluded all of Johnny Rotten's tracks. Early releases came with a copy of the original movie poster.

Track listing

Charts

Certifications

Song notes 
"Johnny B Goode", "Roadrunner", "Anarchy in the UK", "Substitute", "Don't Give Me No Lip, Child", "(I'm Not) Your Stepping Stone", "I Wanna Be Me" and "Watcha Gonna Do About It?" were originally recorded in October 1976. Instrumental tracks for some of these were re-recorded in 1978 by Jones and Cook.

References

Sex Pistols soundtracks
Albums produced by Dave Goodman (record producer)
1979 soundtrack albums
Film soundtracks
Virgin Records soundtracks